Edeltraud Koch (also Edeltraut; born 13 September 1954) is a retired German swimmer. She won a bronze medal at the 1970 European Aquatics Championships in the 100 m butterfly, and a bronze medal at the 1972 Summer Olympics in the 4 × 100 m medley relay. In the relay, West Germany used different swimmers in the preliminaries and in the final; Koch swam in the preliminaries.

References

1954 births
Living people
German female swimmers
Swimmers at the 1972 Summer Olympics
German female butterfly swimmers
Olympic swimmers of West Germany
European Aquatics Championships medalists in swimming
Medalists at the 1972 Summer Olympics
Olympic bronze medalists for West Germany
Sportspeople from Hamm
20th-century German women
21st-century German women